The Magnificent Tommy Flanagan is an album by jazz pianist Tommy Flanagan, with bassist George Mraz, and drummer Al Foster. Flanagan was nominated for a Grammy Award for Best Jazz Instrumental Performance, Soloist, for the album.

Recording and music
The album was recorded on June 2 and 3, 1981, in New York City. Seven of the tracks are standards, and the eighth is "Blueish Grey", by Thad Jones.

Track listing
"Speak Low" (Ogden Nash, Kurt Weill)
"Good Morning Heartache" (Ervin Drake, Dan Fisher, Irene Higginbotham)
"I Fall in Love Too Easily" (Sammy Cahn, Jule Styne)
"Just in Time" (Betty Comden)
"Old Devil Moon" (E.Y. "Yip" Harburg, Burton Lane)
"Ev'rything I Love" (Cole Porter)
"Change Partners" (Irving Berlin)
"Blueish Grey" (Thad Jones)

Personnel
Tommy Flanagan – piano
George Mraz – bass
Al Foster – drums

References

1981 albums
Tommy Flanagan albums